The FiiO X Series is a line of portable music players designed and manufactured by the Chinese company FiiO Electronics Technology.

Models 

 All models support digital audio sampled up to 192 kHz with samples of up to 24 bits.
 All models support the lossless audio formats FLAC, ALAC, Monkey's audio (APE), WMA Lossless, and WAV.
 All models support the lossy audio formats AAC, MP3, Ogg Vorbis, and WMA.
 All models support gapless playback and hardware (non DSP) bass and treble controls.

Reception 

In reviewing the FiiO X3, LA Times' music critic Mark Swed concluded it is a better alternative to an iPod. Swed noted that the X3 utilizes that same digital-to-analog converter that is found in much more expensive players, such as Astell & Kern models that are being sold for $699 and $1,299. In his opinion the FiiO X3 may not have A&K’s sweet and open sound, but it could be purchased for around $200 as of April, 2013.

Steve Guttenberg of CNET compared the FiiO X5 to the Apple iPod Classic and the not-yet-released PonoPlayer. He found the "iPod sounded vague and blurry next to the pristine X5" when playing identical ALAC audio files. The review also noted that the PonoPlayer plays fewer formats than the FiiO X series players, but costs more than the X3.

A review of the X3 in Hi-Fi World reported that the sound and amplification are good, but added that the interface was "least intuitive" and "inelegant." The conclusion was: "a fine budget starting point in high-resolution digital."

X1
The X1 features physical buttons and a spin wheel which "clicks" when rotated. Each "click" of the wheel moves the selected item up or down. There are three buttons on the side of the device, one is used to power up/down the device and put it in sleep mode, while the other two raised buttons function for volume. In addition, when in sleep mode and playing music, the volume up/down buttons can be used for skipping a song or going back a song in the selected album/playlist.

References 

Digital audio players